Iván Oswaldo López (born March 16, 1985 in Mexico City, Mexico) is a Mexican singer known for coming in second place on the fourth season of reality/talent show Objetivo Fama.

On October 30, 2007, Iván released his first album titled La Voz. The title is a reference to the nickname that Hilda Ramos, judge of Objetivo Fama, gave him during one of the shows.

References

External links
Acceso Total Interview

1985 births
Singers from Mexico City
Living people
21st-century Mexican singers
21st-century Mexican male singers